Laurie Ann Davies (born February 27, 1962) is an American politician who serves in the California State Assembly. A Republican, she represents the 74th district, encompassing southern Orange County, including Laguna Niguel, Dana Point, San Juan Capistrano, and San Clemente.

Prior to her election to the Assembly, she was the Mayor of Laguna Niguel (2015–20) and a member of the Laguna Niguel City Council (2012–15). She was elected to the Assembly in 2020, defeating incumbent Republican Bill Brough in the primary and Democratic businessman Scott Reinhart in the general election.

Electoral History

References

External links
Join California Laurie Davies

21st-century American politicians
1962 births
Living people
California State University, Long Beach alumni
Republican Party members of the California State Assembly